SAB World of Beer was a museum of beer, and conference venue operated by South African Breweries; it was located in Newtown, Johannesburg, South Africa.

The museum hosted nearly 50,000 visitors a year, before closing in September 2019.

References

External links
 World of Beer website
 "SAB World of Beer Closure", Southern Africa Tourism Services Association

SABMiller
Museums in Johannesburg
Tourist attractions in Johannesburg
Beer museums